Abibus is the name of several people. These include:

Saints
Abibus of Edessa, a Christian martyr at Edessa, Syria
Abibus of Nekressi, bishop of Nekressi and one of the 13 Syrian apostles of Georgia
Abibus of Alexandria, a deacon and martyr - see Faustus, Abibus and Dionysius of Alexandria
Abibus of Hermopolis, an alternate name of Sabinus of Hermopolis
Abibus of Persia, a companion in martyrdom of Zanitas and Lazarus of Persia
Abibus of Samosata, a Christian martyr in 297
Abibus of Samosata, another man by the same name, a companion in martyrdom of Romanus of Samosata